The Beauharnois Canal is located in southwestern Quebec, Canada. The canal is part of the Saint Lawrence Seaway.

Located in Beauharnois-Salaberry Regional County Municipality within the cities of Salaberry-de-Valleyfield, Beauharnois, Saint-Louis-de-Gonzague, and Saint-Stanislas-de-Kostka, the canal connects Lake Saint-Francis to the west (upstream) with Lake Saint-Louis to the northeast (downstream), bypassing a series of rapids on the Saint Lawrence River.

History

The original Beauharnois Canal opened in 1843, and measured  in length and was built on the south side of the St. Lawrence River. It replaced the Coteau-du-Lac canal. 

The canal became obsolete and was superseded by the Soulanges Canal in 1899 which ran on the north side of the St. Lawrence River.

This canal was built as part of a hydroelectric development at Beauharnois which saw a dam and power house built to take advantage of the  drop between Lake St. Francis and Lake St. Louis. Some of the electricity is used to power a large aluminum smelter  in Beauharnois.

In the 1950s, the Beauharnois Canal had 2 locks added as part of the Saint Lawrence Seaway project, which were inaugurated in 1959. This in turn superseded the Soulanges Canal. The locks enable ships up to 27,000 tons to travel between the two lakes.

Bridges

Bridges over the canal in downstream order are:
  - carrying Routes 132 and 201, and the railway tracks of CSX Transportation, connecting Salaberry-de-Valleyfield with Saint-Stanislas-de-Kostka
 St. Louis Bridge - connecting Salaberry-de-Valleyfield with Saint-Louis-de-Gonzague
  - carrying Autoroute 30
 Pied-du-Canal or CSX Bridge - railroad bridge
 Boulevard Edgar Hébert Bridge - carrying Route 132 between Melocheville and Beauharnois (this crossing consists of a suspension bridge over the discharge of the Beauharnois Power Station and a tunnel under the locks of Beauharnois Canal)

References

External links

Canals in Quebec
Saint Lawrence Seaway
Transport in Montérégie
Buildings and structures in Montérégie
Canals opened in 1843
1843 establishments in Canada
Beauharnois-Salaberry Regional County Municipality